Events from the year 1930 in France.

Incumbents
President: Gaston Doumergue 
President of the Council of Ministers: 
 until 21 February: André Tardieu
 21 February-2 March: Camille Chautemps
 2 March-13 December: André Tardieu
 starting 13 December: Théodore Steeg

Events
10 February – Yen Bai mutiny takes place, an uprising by Vietnamese soldiers in the French colonial army's garrison in Yen Bai.
22 April – London Naval Treaty is agreed between United Kingdom, Japan, France, Italy and the United States.
17 May – Prime Minister André Tardieu decides to withdraw the remaining French troops from the Rhineland. They depart by 30 June.
21 June – One-year conscription comes into force in France.
5 October – British Airship R101 crashes in France en route to India on its maiden voyage.

Sport
2 July – Tour de France begins.
13 July – The first Football World Cup starts: Lucien Laurent scores the first goal, for France against Mexico.
27 July – Tour de France ends, won by André Leducq.

Births

January to June
1 January – Jean-Pierre Duprey, poet and sculptor (died 1959)
13 January – Françoise Prévost, actress (died 1997)
3 February – Roger Duchêne, biographer (died 2006)
20 February – Pierre Gabaye, composer (died 2000)
1 March – Pierre Max Dubois, composer (died 1995)
6 March – Lorin Maazel, conductor, violinist and composer (died 2014)
10 April – Claude Bolling, jazz pianist, composer and arranger (died 2020)
14 April – René Desmaison, mountaineer, climber and alpinist (died 2007)
29 April – Jean Rochefort, actor (died 2017)
30 April – Félix Guattari, militant, institutional psychotherapist and philosopher (died 1992)
25 May – Sonia Rykiel, fashion designer (died 2016)
9 June – Monique Serf, singer (died 1997)
24 June – Pierre Restany, art critic and cultural philosopher (died 2003)

July to December
15 July – Jacques Derrida, philosopher (died 2004)
23 July – Pierre Vidal-Naquet, historian (died 2006)
1 August – Pierre Bourdieu, sociologist (died 2002)
17 August – Jean Bourlès, cyclist (died 2021)
24 September – Catherine Robbe-Grillet, actress, writer, photographer and dominatrix
1 October – Philippe Noiret, actor (died 2006)
10 October – Yves Chauvin, chemist, recipient of 2005 Nobel Prize in Chemistry (died 2015)
18 October – Michel Drach, film director, writer, film producer and actor (died 1990)
29 October – Niki de Saint Phalle, sculptor, painter and filmmaker (died 2002)
13 November 
 Michel Robin, actor (died 2020)
 René-Samuel Sirat, rabbi (died 2023)
14 November – Pierre Bergé, entrepreneur (died 2017)
3 December – Jean-Luc Godard, film director (died 2022)
4 December – René Privat, cyclist (died 1995)
11 December – Jean-Louis Trintignant, actor (died 2022)

Full date unknown
Gérard Granel, philosopher and translator (died 2000)

Deaths
19 March – Joseph Dupont, missionary and bishop (b. 1850)
24 October 
 Paul Émile Appell, mathematician (born 1855)
 Eugène Gley, physiologist and endocrinologist (born 1857)
24 November – Prosper-René Blondlot, physicist (born 1849)
22 December – Marion Manville Pope, American author (born 1859)

See also
 List of French films of 1930

References

1930s in France